David Nye (born 1 January 1958 in Horsham) is a British auto racing driver. When he started racing in 2008 he drove in the Ford Fiesta Championship finishing 3rd overall in Class A. He also drove in the SEAT Cupra Championship finishing 12th overall. For the next two years he drove in the Spanish SEAT Cupra Championship in which he scored a total of 10 points over both seasons. He also drove in a one-off race in the SEAT León Eurocup at Brands Hatch. In 2013 he drove in the British Touring Car Championship for Welch Motorsport.

Racing record

Complete British Touring Car Championship results
(key) Races in bold indicate pole position (1 point awarded in first race) Races in italics indicate fastest lap (1 point awarded all races) * signifies that driver lead race for at least one lap (1 point awarded all races)

References

1958 births
Living people
British Touring Car Championship drivers
Britcar 24-hour drivers
People from Horsham
Sportspeople from West Sussex
24H Series drivers